The 2016 Challenger Banque Nationale de Drummondville was a professional tennis tournament played on indoor hard courts. It was the 10th edition of the tournament and part of the 2016 ATP Challenger Tour, offering a total of $50,000 in prize money. It took place in Drummondville, Canada between March 14 and March 20, 2016.

Singles main-draw entrants

Seeds

1 Rankings are as of March 7, 2016

Other entrants
The following players received wildcards into the singles main draw:
 Filip Peliwo
 Peter Polansky
 Denis Shapovalov

The following players received entry as alternates:
 Deiton Baughman 
 Filip Horanský 
 Evan King 
 Blake Mott

The following players received entry from the qualifying draw:
 Winston Lin
 Hugo Nys
 Nicolás Jarry
 Tim van Rijthoven

The following player received entry as a lucky loser:
 Edward Corrie

Champions

Singles

 Daniel Evans def.  Edward Corrie, 6–3, 6–4

Doubles

 James Cerretani /  Max Schnur def.  Daniel Evans /  Lloyd Glasspool, 3–6, 6–3, [11–9]

External links
Official website

Challenger Banque Nationale de Drummondville
Challenger de Drummondville
Challenger Banque Nationale de Drummondville